George Frizzell Parrish (March 23, 1897 -  September 22, 1971) was a three-sport athlete at Virginia Tech in the early 20th century.    He was a native of Bristol, Virginia.  

Parrish was unanimously named the first team all-South Atlantic Intercollegiate Athletic Association center three times in the seasons ending in 1919, 1920 and 1921.  He scored 320 points in the 1919 season.  In 1921, he scored 348 points on 116 field goals and 116 free throws. This represented almost half of the team's 723 total points.    

He was also an all-South Atlantic Conference end for the football team,  and competed in the discus and javelin events for the track and field team.  At the end of 1919, he held the Tech javelin record throw of 146.5 feet.   

He was inducted in the Virginia Tech Sports Hall of Fame in 1986, the fifth class of Hall of Fame inductees.

References

1897 births
1971 deaths
All-American college men's basketball players
American men's basketball players
Basketball players from Virginia
People from Bristol, Virginia
Players of American football from Virginia
Virginia Tech Hokies football players
Virginia Tech Hokies men's basketball players
Virginia Tech Hokies track and field athletes